Meghnad Bhattacharya (born 1952) is a Bengali theatre director and actor. He is the artistic director of Bengali theatre group Sayak. He has also acted in few Bengali films and television serials. In 1979 under the leadership of Bhattacharya and Sayak Bijon Theatre was established.

Biography 

Bhattacharya was born in 1952. In December 1973 he founded the Bengali theatre group Sayak which till January 2012 has staged 21 full length and 7 short length plays.

Works

Plays

Films

Awards
 ABP Ananda Sera Bangali Award: 2022

References

External links 
 

1952 births
Bengali theatre personalities
Living people
Male actors in Bengali cinema
Place of birth missing (living people)
Date of birth missing (living people)
Bengali actors
Dramatists and playwrights  from West Bengal